Shattered Union is a turn-based tactics video game developed by PopTop Software and published by 2K Games in October 2005.

Plot

In 2008, David Jefferson Adams becomes the 44th President of the United States following a disputed election and a tie vote in the Electoral College (and subsequent tie-breaker by the United States House of Representatives), becoming the most hated and unpopular president in U.S. history.

A combination of foreign terrorist attacks and poor economic conditions contributes to civil unrest. As a result, rioting springs up all throughout the United States, with domestic terrorism becoming an increasing threat. In response, President Adams uses the Homeland Security Act and declares martial law on many areas of the country, but it is particularly concentrated on the West Coast.

Four years later, during the 2012 United States presidential election, the Supreme Court of the United States disqualifies all the popular presidential candidates from several states, effectively handing Adams his reelection.  The public reacts violently when incumbent Adams accepts a second term.

During the Inauguration Ball in Washington, D.C. on the night of January 20, 2013, a low-yield tactical nuclear weapon is detonated in an apparent groundburst, presumably having been concealed there in advance. The yield is sufficient to destroy most of the city, killing Adams, his cabinet, and most of the U.S. Congress, effectively wiping out the presidential line of succession and thrusting the already unstable United States into total chaos.

The European Parliament meets in an emergency session, and votes to send peacekeepers to the Washington Metropolitan Area to secure international interests and protection of European citizens in the United States. As secessionist sentiment rises in America, the governor of California declares home rule, and California secedes from the Union on April 15, 2013. Texas follows a few days later, on April 17, 2013, taking neighboring states with it and re-forming the Republic of Texas. The Confederated States of America is reborn shortly afterwards, with other geographic regions becoming sovereign nations out of concern for survival. By 2014, all hopes for a peaceful resolution are gone, and the Second American Civil War begins.

Early in the war, Russia invades and occupies Alaska, using the expanded military operations of the European Union as an excuse. The invasion is personally led by President Nicholai Vladekov, an ex-general and former Soviet hardliner, who claims that Alaska was never really part of the United States and that Russia is merely reclaiming its former territory. What little resistance does occur is confused and disorganized, making the invasion largely unopposed.

Later, Interpol reveals the results of its investigation regarding the Inauguration Day bombing. President Vladekov had been dealing weapons on the black market for more than thirty years and masterminded the D.C. bombing as part of his goal to disrupt the world economy so that Russia could regain its military dominance, and more easily control Europe. Protests throughout Russia force Vladekov to declare martial law in Moscow.

After the former contiguous United States is unified under one faction, the independent Commonwealth of Hawaii agrees to join the new government. Vladekov refuses to cede control of Alaska, so the faction's forces prepare to invade the state and drive the Russians out of North America. A closing cinematic depicts the aftermath of the war.

If the invasion fails, the reunified U.S. is still suffering unrest and faces an uncertain future. If the invasion succeeds and the player faction's reputation is very good, the troubled American states are "united again under uncommon greatness" – a leader whose merciful acts and strategic and tactical brilliance will be spoken of for centuries to come. If the player faction's reputation is very bad, the U.S. transforms into a new fascist state, "one that will never again feel the sting of dissent".

Factions

The factions in the game include the entirety or portions of the following states:

California Commonwealth: Arizona, California, Nevada, Utah
Commonwealth of Hawaii: Hawaii (non-playable faction)
Confederacy: Alabama, Florida, Georgia, Kentucky, Louisiana, Mississippi, North Carolina, South Carolina, Tennessee,  Virginia
European Union Occupation: Delaware, District of Columbia, Maryland, New Jersey, Pennsylvania, Virginia
Great Plains Federation: Illinois, Indiana, Iowa,  Kansas, Michigan, Minnesota, Missouri, Nebraska, North Dakota, South Dakota, Wisconsin
New England Alliance: Connecticut, Maine, Massachusetts, New Hampshire, New Jersey, New York, Ohio, Pennsylvania, Rhode Island, West Virginia, Vermont
Pacifica: Colorado, Idaho,  Montana, Oregon, Washington, Wyoming
Republic of Texas: Arkansas, New Mexico, Oklahoma, Texas
Russia: Alaska (only multiplayer)

Gameplay
The game is based on a hex grid system. The various factions left over when the country broke apart (see below) wage warfare in numerous territories. The amount of income the player gets each round of attacks is based on how many territories they control. When attacking a territory, the player selects which of their units to deploy to that area on the Deployment screen. If a unit is deployed to one area, it cannot be redeployed to another until that round of attacks is over. Each side can choose to either manually place their units on the battlefield where they want them to be, or have the computer do it for them automatically, with the Manual and Auto buttons on the deployment screen.

In each area there are various forms of terrain, each with its own effect on how a unit moves. Roads enable much faster movement, but decrease the unit's defense score. Forests, mountains, swamps, and other such terrain greatly decrease unit movement, but most increase defense. Cities do not have much of an effect on a unit's movement (unless a road runs through it, in which case it is increased), but increase the unit's defense. If not crossed by a bridge, rivers heavily hinder unit movement, slowing down infantry, requiring a whole day (turn) to cross for some vehicle units, and completely blocking other units, which must search for an intact bridge. Two units, enemy or allied, can never occupy the same hex at once.

Combat itself takes the form of one unit directly engaging another, without outside interference from any other units which might be in the area. The attacking unit always fires first. If the defending unit is still alive following the first strike, it will retaliate against the attacking unit. Each unit can only attack once per turn and retaliate once per turn, unless a sidebar power enables another attack. Air attacks are always retaliated against, provided that the unit has an anti-air score and will not get killed by the air unit's attack first.

Each unit type has three statistics for attacking: effectiveness against infantry (EI), effectiveness against vehicles (EV), and effectiveness against air units (EA). If the attacker's effectiveness stat against the unit type of the defender is higher than the defender's armor rating, damage will be done according to Attacker Effectiveness # - Defender Armor #. If not, no damage or extremely low damage will be done. Some units are specialized to only be able to attack a single type of unit.  If enough damage is done to a unit, it will be destroyed.

The objective of the battle is either to destroy all the enemy's units or capture enough objective towns to control the battlefield. Objective towns can be identified for both their Objective Point worth and position on the Map screen, and can be made visible on the main battle screen using the Objective button (flag).

On the left side of the screen are the Sidebar Powers. These powers recharge over time, and the amount of time until they are usable again is shown over their picture/button. In the campaign, depending on their political rating (judged by how much Collateral Damage (see below) they inflicts), the player will get more powers of varying type.

Unit data
In battle, if the player clicks on one of their own units, a bar will appear in the lower right corner. This bar shows all the immediate stats for the unit, including EI, EV, and EA stats, their armor rating (how much attack power a unit can shrug off before it takes damage), their health rating (how much more damage the unit can take until it dies) and their gas level. Gas is required for vehicle and helicopter units to move- moving one hex drains one point of gas. If a unit runs out of fuel, it can still attack within its range, but it cannot move for a turn or so until it is resupplied. Infantry, obviously, do not require fuel.

There will also be a question-mark button next to the basic stats. Clicking this gives the player a more detailed setup of stats, including its Movement rating (the tire; how many hexes a unit can move per turn), its Attack Range (the target; how many hexes away from itself the unit can attack), its line-of-sight (binoculars; how far away from itself the unit can see), and its collateral damage rating (explosion; how much damage the unit will do depends on the surrounding environment when it attacks).

As units survive multiple combats they also increase in rank. Higher ranked units gain bonuses to their attack, defense, and health.

Specific units
There are three general types and nine general classes of units. The types are Infantry, Vehicles, and Aircraft. The classes are One-Time Use units, Infantry, Light Armor, Medium Armor, Heavy Armor, Artillery, Anti-Aircraft, Helicopters, and Aircraft. Each class has a variety of specific units, varying in effectiveness with cost.

One-time use units
These are units that a faction can purchase for use in a single battle. These include defensive towers and bunkers, fixed artillery, and light infantry.

Infantry
There are three varieties of infantry units, each with its own specialized purpose. Commando-style units are effective against infantry and vehicles, but have no anti-air ability. Heavy infantry are able to attack aircraft and vehicles. Engineers are the weakest in direct combat, but have the ability to construct and place barbed wire, dragon's teeth (an anti-vehicle barricade), and land mines that damage enemies which move over them.

Light, medium, and heavy armor
All three of these are varieties of armor, with similar abilities and differing mainly in cost to attack points. Armor is a primarily anti-vehicle class, but some varieties are more effective against infantry. Light armor is armored personnel carriers like the M2/M3 Bradley, medium armor is light tanks like the EU's French-made AMX-30, and heavy armor consists of main battle tanks like the M1 Abrams and the EU's German-made Leopard 2. In addition, 6 out of the 7 factions fields a unique, more expensive heavy armor unit, such as the slow-moving but extremely well armed and armored Hood tank fielded by the Republic of Texas.

Artillery
Similar to fighters and bombers, artillery units are powerful support units, but possessing many significant limitations. A target must be at least two hexes away for artillery to fire on it, leaving such units vulnerable to close-up attacks. Artillery units can also do little to defend themselves in most cases, with only a few out of all in the game having any real armor and/or anti-air capability. However, artillery units have the longest firing range of any unit type in the game- up to five hexes away. Though they require extensive support and are vulnerable by themselves, artillery units are extremely powerful and can prove devastating if used in significant numbers. One of the factions fields a unique self-propelled artillery.

Anti-air
Anti-air units have low or nonexistent ratings against armor and moderate to nonexistent ratings against infantry, but they are unparalleled in their ability to destroy any airborne unit. In addition, each anti-air unit has a "radius of protection" around it; any fighter or bomber unit attacking another unit within that radius gets attacked by the AA unit as well as the defending unit.

Helicopters
With the longest line-of-sight, the highest per-turn movement rate, and unimpeded by terrain, helicopters make both good scout and combat units. They can move from one front of attack to another with high speed, and are effective against most types of units. A significant downside to helicopters is that they cannot capture or hold objectives, which means they can only act as support. Helicopters also attract considerable attention from enemy fighter aircraft and AA units, meaning they ultimately require much support from a faction's other air and ground forces.

Aircraft
Aircraft do not move along the field like other units- they are based at an Airfield and are called in via the Air Strike command menu. There are two types of aircraft: fighter and bomber. Both are extreme in their cost of purchase and capability in combat, but have significant limitations. AA fire and enemy fighters are a significant threat to both types of aircraft- if the enemy has two or more such units in range of an area where a fighter or bomber is ordered to attack, the aircraft will be destroyed.

Fighter craft have no ground attack capability- they can only fight against other aircraft. Fighters can also "patrol" an area from around a hex visible to the player, lending their line-of-sight to it and their protection to the units below- if an enemy aircraft tries to attack a unit within the radius of the fighter's patrol sweep, it is intercepted- but not always shot down- by the fighter. Patrols reset after one turn of both the player and the enemy. Fighters always cause damage to other fighters in battles, even if the other fighter shoots them down; however, a patrolling fighter attacking another craft coming into its patrol radius (if not directly attacked itself) does not suffer retaliatory attack.

Bombers, on the other hand, have no anti-air capability. They cannot patrol as fighters do, but instead are called into attack a single target and leave. The attacks of bombers can cause devastating damage to enemy units, and bombers are able to withstand more enemy fire than fighters. They are some of the most expensive units in the game, and the loss of even one to AA fire can sometimes mean an irreparable blow to that faction.

Reception

Shattered Union received "average" reviews on both platforms according to the review aggregation website Metacritic. The gameplay was praised as being "simple but deep", and the concept was well liked, while criticisms included unbalanced AI and a total lack of any diplomacy features.

Legacy

Film adaptation
In 2009, Variety and Gamasutra reported that Jerry Bruckheimer was creating a movie adaptation of the video game to be distributed by Touchstone Pictures. J. Michael Straczynski was set to write the script.

References

External links
 
 Shattered Union developer's website
 

2005 video games
2K games
Alternate history video games
American Civil War video games
Computer wargames
Political video games
Multiplayer and single-player video games
Turn-based strategy video games
Turn-based tactics video games
Video games developed in the United States
Video games set in 2008
Video games set in 2012
Video games set in 2013
War video games set in the United States
Windows games
Xbox games
Video games set in 2014
Video games set in Canada
Second American Civil War speculative fiction